Lucknow, the capital and the Largest City of Uttar Pradesh state of India has schools, degree colleges, universities & research institutions.

Universities 
Lucknow is home to universities offering courses on campus. These universities are:
 Babu Banarasi Das University
 Babasaheb Bhimrao Ambedkar University
 Integral University
 Dr. A.P.J. Abdul Kalam Technical University (APJAKTU)
 Dr. Ram Manohar Lohia National Law University
 Dr. Shakuntala Misra National Rehabilitation University, Lucknow
 Era University
 University of Lucknow
 Khwaja Moinuddin Chishti Languages University
 Darul Uloom Nadwatul Ulama

Medical 
There are Medical Colleges in the city:
 Sanjay Gandhi Post Graduate Institute of Medical Sciences (SGPGIMS)
 King George's Medical University (KGMU)
 Dr. Ram Manohar Lohia Institute of Medical Sciences (DrRMLIMS)
 Atal Bihari Vajpayee Medical University 
Era University (EU)
 T.S. Misra Medical College and Hospital
 Career Institute of Medical Sciences and Hospital, Lucknow
 T.S. Misra Medical College & Hospital, Lucknow

Degree / Post Graduation Colleges 
 Institute of Cooperative and Corporate Management Research & Training (ICCMRT), Indira Nagar, Lucknow ( U.P. State Govt. offering M.B.A, B.B.A, B. Com -H)
 Bhalchandra Group of Institutions
 The Study Hall College
 D.A.V. P.G. College, Lucknow
 Isabella Thoburn College (often referred to as "IT College")
 Amiruddaula Islamia Degree College, (often referred to as just Islamia College) 
 Sultanul Madaris
 Lucknow Christian College
 Techno Institute of Management Sciences, Lucknow
 National P.G. College, Lucknow
 Shia P.G. College Lucknow
Shri Jai Narain P.G. College(KKC), Lucknow
Kendrika Academy Lucknow

Management 
Lucknow has management institutes, which include IIM Lucknow. Lucknow University has a Business Administration department. There are institutes in the private sector.                
 Ambalika Institute of Management and Technology
 Jaipuria Institute of Management, Lucknow
 School of Management Sciences, Lucknow
 IILM Academy of Higher Learning, Lucknow
 Institute of Cooperative and Corporate Management Research & Training (ICCMRT), Indira Nagar, Lucknow.

Technology 
Indian Institute of Information Technology, Lucknow
Institute of Engineering and Technology, Lucknow
 Shri Ram Murti Smarak College of Engineering and Technology, Lucknow
 SIMT (Sevdie Institute of Management & Technology), Lucknow
 Saroj Institute of Technology and Management, Lucknow
 B.N. College Of Engineering And Technology, Lucknow
 R. R. Group of Institutions

Architecture 
 Government College of Architecture

Art and Culture 
 Bhatkhande Sanskriti Vishwavidyalaya

Research institutes 
Lucknow has research and development centres:
 Central Drug Research Institute 
 Central Institute of Medicinal and Aromatic Plants 
 Central Institute of Plastics Engineering and Technology 
 Indian Institute of Toxicology Research (Formerly : Industrial Toxicology Research Centre (ITRC))
 National Botanical Research Institute
 Research Design and Standards Organisation
 Indian Institute of Sugarcane Research
 National Bureau of Fish and Genetic Resource (NBFGR), Ganga Aquarium

Schools and colleges 
Stella Maris Inter College, Lucknow
Lucknow Nobel Academy, Chinhut, Lucknow
Aminabad Inter College, Lucknow
Bal Vidya Mandir, Lucknow
Bharatiya Vidya Bhavan, Gomti Nagar, Lucknow
C.P.L. Public Inter College, Nagram, Gosainganj, Lucknow
Capital Convent College
Cathedral School of Lucknow
Central Academy Senior Secondary School
Chiranjiv Bharati Schools
Christ Church, Lucknow
Colvin Taluqdar's College
City Convent School, Rajajipuram, Lucknow
City Montessori School
 Delhi Public School, Indiranagar, Lucknow
D.A.V. College
Foster Academy, Abrar Nagar, Kalyanpur, Lucknow
Govt. Jubilee Inter College, Lucknow
HAL School
La Martinière iCollege
Lucknow International Public School
Lucknow Public School
Loreto Convent
Mary Gardiner's Convent School
Mahanagar Boys Inter College
Maharishi Vidya Mandir
Modern School, Lucknow
New Public Collegiate, Lucknow
Pioneer Montessori Inter College
Rani Laxmi Bai Memorial Senior Secondary School
Red Rose Senior Secondary School, Lucknow
 Spring Dale College
 SKD Academy
Seth M.R. Jaipuria School, Lucknow
St. Agnes' Loreto Day School
St. Antony's Inter College, Lucknow
St. Dominic Savio College
St. John Bosco College, Gomti Nagar, Lucknow
St. Fidelis College
St. Francis' College, Lucknow
St. Paul's College, Lucknow
St Thomas College Lucknow
Seth M.R Japuria School, Goel Campus, Lucknow
Shri Ramswaroop Memorial Public School
The Millennium School Lucknow
U.P. Sainik School
Kali Charan Inter College
Guru Gobind Singh Sports College
AvR Academy
Exon Montessori School Lucknow
Vidya Ashram Career Institute

References 

 
Education
Lists of universities and colleges in Uttar Pradesh